Sidor Belarsky, born Isidor Livshitz (December 27, 1898 – June 7, 1975), was a Ukrainian-American singer born to a Jewish family in Kryzhopil, Ukraine. He came to the United States in 1930 or 1931. He died at North Shore University Hospital in Manhasset, New York in 1975.

His recording of "Dem Milners Trern" ("The Miller's Tears"), a Yiddish folk song composed by M. M. Warshavsky, was featured in the Coen brothers's film, A Serious Man. The song's subject is the expulsion of Jews from hundreds of villages in Czarist Russia.

Discography
Forward 70th Anniversary: Sidor Belarsky Sings of the Hopes and Dreams of the East Side, Lazar Weiner, piano. Artistic Enterprises, Inc. (c. 1967) (presented by the Forward Association and The Workmen's Circle)

Notes

References

External links

1898 births
1975 deaths
Jews from the Russian Empire
Ukrainian Jews
Jewish singers
20th-century Ukrainian male singers
Yiddish-language singers
Soviet emigrants to the United States
Yiddish-language singers of the United States